Where Hope Grows is a 2014 American drama film written and directed by Chris Dowling and starring David DeSanctis, Danica McKellar, Kerr Smith, Brooke Burns, William Zabka, Kristoffer Polaha and McKaley Miller. It was released on May 15, 2015, by Roadside Attractions.

Plot
A baseball player whose professional career was cut short due to personal problems is suddenly awakened and invigorated by a young-man with Down syndrome who works at the local grocery store. Calvin Campbell is a retired baseball player and a father to Katie Campbell, an independent teenager. One day when he goes shopping for alcohol at the local market he meets an employee of the market. He talks to Produce and is shocked when Produce gives him a hug.

After freezing at home plate, professional baseball player Calvin Campbell retired from the Detroit Tigers and retreated to his hometown in St. Matthews, Kentucky where he put his life on hold for years to nurse his damaged pride.

Locked in self-pity, Calvin now spends his days trying to drown the memory of his personal and professional failure in a bottle. But his alcoholism seeps into and soils every part of his life. As Katie, his sixteen-year-old daughter, battles for his attention, she turns to unhealthy relationships in a desperate attempt to fill a need left void by a disappointing and absent father.  

But then a crushed tomato at the local supermarket leads Calvin to an unlikely source of hope, “Produce”, the fruit and vegetable boy with Down syndrome. Joyful and eager to help, Produce uses his job to build personal connections with shoppers. After meeting Calvin, Produce confronts his dark depression with a burst of joy through his knowledge of produce and his love for people. When Calvin’s life continues deteriorating, he finds himself drawn to the produce aisle for a listening ear, and soon a unique friendship forms between the two.

As Calvin and Produce spend time together, Produce’s contagious attitude toward life leaves behind an impression that Calvin can’t fight off. But Produce is not without his own battles. With an unfulfilled dream of becoming employee of the month, Produce fights to stand for truth even when it results in being bullied. As Produce confronts his personal hardships, he shows Calvin a new way of dealing with disappointment: holding tightly to faith rather than a bottle.

Several days later, a heated conversation with a close friend leaves Calvin reaching for the bottle. When Produce finds him incoherent, he takes Calvin's keys, preventing him from attending a job interview with the one Minor League Baseball team willing to give him a second chance. Drunk and jobless, Calvin sinks further into hopelessness and the pain of his selfish actions confronts him head on as his daughter finally admits to giving up on him.

The weight of life's choices settles on Calvin and he turns to Produce for guidance as he wrestles with his past and fights to end his old habits. When a tragic accident leaves Calvin mourning the loss of a friend, he finds renewed determination to pursue a healthier lifestyle modeled by Produce to create a better life for himself and his daughter.

Cast
David DeSanctis as Produce
Kristoffer Polaha as Calvin Campbell
McKaley Miller as Katie Campbell
Michael Grant as Colt Beam
William Zabka as Milton Malcolm
Danica McKellar as Susan Malcolm
Kerr Smith as Mitch Minniear
Brooke Burns as Amy Boone
Alan Powell as Franklin Weaver
Clyde Jones as Dexter Douglas
J. Teddy Garces as Dr. Jones
Robert Johnson as Mr. Beam
Ken Arnold as Steve Bookerson
Chase Anderson as Jackson
Rebecca Lines as Laura
Phil Russell as Police Officer
Drew Cash as Eric
Sonya Thaper as Nurse Meera
Michelle J. Fine as Nurse Kristen

Release
The film was released on May 15, 2015, by Roadside Attractions.

Reception
Where Hope Grows received mixed reviews from critics. On Rotten Tomatoes, the film has a rating of 50%, based on 15 reviews, with a rating of 4.9/10. On Metacritic, the film has a score of 41 out of 100, based on 8 critics, indicating "mixed or average reviews".

References

External links
 
 

2014 films
2014 drama films
2010s English-language films
2010s American films
American drama films
Films about disability